Hedonimetry is the study of happiness as a measurable economic asset.  The first major work in the field was an 1881 publication of Mathematical Psychics by the famous statistician and economist Francis Ysidro Edgeworth, who hypothesized a way of measuring happiness in units.   In recent times, it has been applied to many areas, including consumer behavior and health care.

See also
 Hedonometer

References

Utility